Flood (Hebrew: מבול, Mabul) is the second album by Israeli singer-songwriter Keren Peles. By September 2008, it sold more than 20,000 copies, making it her second gold album in Israel.

Track listing
"Mabul" (Flood) מבול
"Ma SheBe'emet" (What Really) מה שבאמת
"Ratza HaBaita" (She Ran Home) רצה הביתה
"Sex 'Im Ha'Ex" (Sex with the Ex) סקס עם האקס
"El Ishekh Shtiqatekh " (Don't Silence Your Man) אל אישך שתיקתך
"Pizho 92" פיז'ו 92
"BeMekhonyt Leyad HaYam" (In a Car Next to the Sea) במכונית ליד הים
"Sof HaRegesh" (The End of the Feeling) סוף הרגש
"Hu Mitqasher Elai" (He Is Calling Me) הוא מתקשר אליי
"Soni Etzel Shoni" (Sonny's at Shoni Place) סוני אצל שוני
"Tqufa Shel Shinuyim" (A Period of Changes) תקופה של שינויים
"Po Leyad HaYarkon" (Here Next to the Yarkon) פה ליד הירקון
"Shana Khad Sit'rit" (One Way Year) שנה חד סטרית

Keren Peles albums
2008 albums